Frank Arthur McElwain (December 14, 1875 – September 19, 1957) was a Bishop of Minnesota in The Episcopal Church.

Early life and education
McElwain was born on December 14, 1875 in Warsaw, New York, the son of James Frank McElwain and Mary Stewart Arthur. He studied at Trinity College from where he graduated with a Bachelor of Arts in 1899, a Master of Arts in 1902, and awarded a Doctor of Divinity in 1913. He also earned a Bachelor of Divinity from Seabury-Western Theological Seminary in 1902.

Ordained Ministry
McElwain was ordained deacon on June 11, 1902 and priest on February 6, 1903 by Bishop Edward Robert Atwill. He then ministered in Missouri between 1902 and 1905. In 1905, he became an instructor in the Old and New Testament at the Seabury Divinity School, while in 1907, he was elected warden of the school.

Bishop
McElwain was elected Suffragan Bishop of Minnesota in 1912, and was consecrated in the Cathedral of Our Merciful Saviour on October 30, 1912. He was elected diocesan bishop on May 23, 1917, and served as diocesan bishop from 1917 until 1943. McElwain also served as dean of Seabury-Western Theological Seminary and was the author of The Permanent Element in Old Testament Prophecy.

References

1875 births
1957 deaths
Episcopal bishops of Minnesota

19th-century Anglican theologians
20th-century Anglican theologians